The Maisinger Bach is a river in Bavaria, Germany. It flows into Lake Starnberg, which is drained by the Würm, in Starnberg.

See also
List of rivers of Bavaria

References

Rivers of Bavaria
Rivers of Germany